(1364 in Bursa, Ottoman Empire – 1436 in Samarqand, Timurid Empire), whose actual name was Salah al-Din Musa Pasha ( means "son of the judge", al-rūmī "the Roman" indicating he came from Asia Minor, which was once Roman), was a Turkish astronomer and mathematician who worked at the observatory in Samarkand. He computed sin 1° to an accuracy of 10−12.

Together with Ulugh Beg, al-Kāshī and a few other astronomers, Qāḍī Zāda produced the Zij-i-Sultani, the first comprehensive stellar catalogue since the Maragheh observatory's Zij-i Ilkhani two centuries earlier. The Zij-i Sultani contained the positions of 992 stars.

His works 
Sharh al-Mulakhkhas (Commentary on Jaghmini's compendium on the science of Astronomy)
Sharh Ashkal al-Ta'sis (Commentary on Samarkandi's Arithmetics)

Further reading

External links
  (PDF version)

1364 births
1436 deaths
14th-century mathematicians
15th-century mathematicians
Mathematicians of the medieval Islamic world
15th-century astronomers
Medieval Turkic mathematicians
Geometers
Scientists from the Ottoman Empire